The Democratic Intellect: Scotland and her Universities in the Nineteenth Century is a 1961 book by philosopher George Elder Davie.

1961 non-fiction books
Contemporary philosophical literature
Books about Scotland
1961 in Scotland
Philosophy of education
British philosophy
Higher education in Scotland
19th century in Scotland